This is a list of appearances for J-pop group Morning Musume.

Television

Radio

Commercials
 i-zone Hit Parade (2000, Polaroid)
 Tokyo Walker (2000, Kadokawa)
 Aircon「Kaiteki 3 mai」, N Keikaku (Kirei Nado) (2000-2001, Matsushita Electric Industrial Co., Ltd.)
 Yamucharou (2000-2001, Japan Tobacco)
 Dream Net (2000-2002, Dream Net)
 e-kara (2000-2003, e-kara)
 Pocky (2000-2003, Glico)
 Wasshoi! FIFA World Cup he Ikerundeso Matsuri (2001, Fuji Film) - 10 nin matsuri
 Saltimbanco (2001, Daily YAMAZAKI) -「Inspiration」「Renai Revolution 21」
 Elleseine (2001- ）- Yuko Nakazawa and a few MM members
 Scoopy, Dio nado (2002-2003, Honda)
 Kiriri (2002-2003, Kirin Beverage)
 Quidam (2002-2003, Fuji TV) 「Quidam ga kimasu」「Zo wa demasen」「Quidam gaisen」
 Yomiuri Shimbun (2002)
 Japan Defense Agency - Self-Defense Force Recruitment Poster (2003)
 Colorio Printer (2004-, Epson Seiko Corporation) - Aya Matsuura and MM members

Movies

Musicals

Concerts

DVD/VHS 
This section lists DVD and VHS releases of television shows, movies, musicals, etc.

Game 

* Features the group's 8th single "Koi no Dance Site"

References 

Appearances
Musical group filmographies